Adanac Ski Hill is a downhill ski area within the city of Sudbury in Northeastern Ontario, Canada. It is owned and operated by the City of Greater Sudbury.

The public facilities include a main chalet (which includes seating, storage, washrooms, and a canteen), a rental shack, and the Canadian Ski Patrol quarters.

In the summer of 2017, the city of Greater Sudbury provided Adanac Ski Hill with a grant, of which it used to buy a new Doppelmayr quad lift, and it is now situated to the left of the old lift.

See also
List of ski areas and resorts in Canada

References

External links

Sports venues in Greater Sudbury
Ski areas and resorts in Ontario